Seshadripuram Public School is affiliated to ICSE Board - New Delhi offering co-education. It is located at Mother Dairy Road, Yelahanka New Town, Bangalore, Karnataka, India. The school was established in 2002. It is one of the best ICSE schools in Bangalore. The school offers education from Montessori to Grade XII with medium of study as English. The school takes pride of securing 100% results since 2007 in the ICSE X board Examination.

References

External links
http://www.spsynk.ac.in

High schools and secondary schools in Bangalore